The Black Lion is a Grade II* listed public house at 274 Kilburn High Road, Kilburn, London.

It is on the Campaign for Real Ale's National Inventory of Historic Pub Interiors.

It was built in about 1898 by the architect R. A. Lewcock (1846–1932), with the interior carved panels by Frederick T Callcott.

References

Grade II* listed buildings in the London Borough of Camden
Grade II* listed pubs in London
National Inventory Pubs
Kilburn, London
Pubs in the London Borough of Camden